Professor Leonardo "The Wizard" Xavier was born on January 3, 1976, in Rio de Janeiro, Brazil.  At the age of 5, Leo ventured into his first martial art, taking judo in school. At the age of 13 Leo began to take Tae Kwon Do classes. Finally, at the age of 15 a friend introduced him to Brazilian jiu-jitsu.

Leo immediately became good friends with his coaches, Royler Gracie and Saulo Ribeiro. Under their watchful eye, Leo began to successfully compete in local and regional tournaments in Brazil and, while he was still a blue belt, Leo began to help with classes.  Leo trained during this time at the legendary birthplace of Gracie Jiu-Jitsu, Gracie Humaitá Academy in Rio.  In 1999, Leo realized his dream of being promoted to black belt from the hands of his coaches Royler Gracie and Saulo Ribeiro.  He is one of an elite group who have had the privilege and honor of teaching Jiu-Jitsu at the Gracie Humaitá Academy.

In May, 2008, Professor Xavier was promoted by Royler Gracie to the rank of third degree black belt in Gracie Jiu-Jitsu.

He is currently (2014) a 4th degree promoted by Rickson Gracie and recognized by Jiu-Jitsu Global Federation (JJGF).

Lineage 

Mitsuyo Maeda (前田光世) → Carlos Gracie Sr. → Hélio Gracie → Royler and Rickson Gracie → Leonardo Xavier

Accomplishments in the Art of Brazilian Jiu-Jitsu 

Multiple Medals at the World Jiu-Jitsu Championship (including 2 bronze at black belt)
2006 Pan-American Games Champion (Masters Black Belt Featherweight)
Two Time Brazilian National Champion
Multiple Time Rio de Janeiro State Champion
Instructor of many International and Pan American BJJ Champions
Instructor of the 2005 International Grappling Festival Overall Team Champion
Instructor of the 2006 Elite Grapplers Championship Overall Team Champion
Instructor of the 2006 GC Championship Overall Team Champion
Instructor of the 2009 Two-time North American Grappling Association (NAGA) Overall team champion
Texas Police and Fire Games Grappling Champion Instructor
Defense Tactics Instructor of The Sugar Land Police Department
International Brazilian jiu-jitsu Federation Certified Referee
 World Class Referee

Leo is also considered a World Class Referee of Brazilian jiu-jitsu and Submission Wrestling.

Relocation to the United States 

In 2000, Professor Xavier traveled to the United States to give several seminars. He liked the United States, and started to travel often to the US teaching the art that he loves. In 2003, Leo realized that he loved teaching his style of Jiu-Jitsu to the American people and moved to United States. Leo now intends to remain in the United States to continue his work and efforts to develop Jiu-Jitsu in the United States. Leo is currently developing and expanding Gracie Jiu-Jitsu in Sugar Land, Texas (Houston Area), where he lives and operates the LX Jiu-Jitsu School.

He is recognized in the martial arts world, and Jiu-Jitsu community, as one of the most charismatic professors; as well he is noted as a world-class authority of the art. With more than 20 years of experience, Leo is highly sought after for teaching seminars and courses around the World.

Few people can match his ability to combine a deep knowledge of the art with a passion and enthusiasm for teaching the legion of loyal students that he gained all over the world.

References 

 International Federation of Brazilian jiu-jitsu. World Championship, Results. ibjjf.com.

External links
Official Website
Rickson Gracie Official Website

Brazilian practitioners of Brazilian jiu-jitsu
Living people
1976 births